The Florida Project is a 2017 American coming-of-age drama film directed by Sean Baker and written by Baker and Chris Bergoch. It stars Willem Dafoe, Brooklynn Prince, Bria Vinaite, Valeria Cotto, Christopher Rivera, and Caleb Landry Jones, and was the first film appearance for many of the cast members. The slice of life plot focuses on the summertime adventures of a six-year-old girl who lives with her unemployed single mother in a budget motel in Kissimmee, Florida. Their struggle to make ends meet and stave off homelessness takes place in an environment dominated by the nearby Walt Disney World, which was code named "The Florida Project" during its early planning stages.

The film premiered in the Directors' Fortnight section of the 2017 Cannes Film Festival, and was released theatrically in the United States by A24 on October 6, 2017. It was acclaimed by critics, who lauded Baker's direction and the performances, particularly those of Dafoe, Prince, and Vinaite. For their work in the film, Dafoe earned Best Supporting Actor nominations at the Academy Awards, Golden Globes, SAG Awards, and BAFTA Awards, and Prince won the Critics' Choice Movie Award for Best Young Performer. Both the National Board of Review and the American Film Institute chose the film as one of the top ten films of the year.

Plot
Six-year-old Moonee lives with her young single mother Halley at Magic Castle Inn & Suites, a budget motel in Kissimmee, Florida, near Walt Disney World. She spends most of her summer days unsupervised and making mischief with her downstairs neighbor Scooty, who Halley is supposed to watch while his mother works at a diner, and Dicky, who lives at the nearby Futureland Inn. After Stacy, a new resident at Futureland, catches the trio spitting on her car, Dicky is grounded for a week, and Moonee and Scooty meet and befriend Stacy's granddaughter Jancey, who lives with Stacy, when Stacy makes them clean up their mess.

Halley recently lost her job as an exotic dancer, which affects her eligibility for TANF benefits, and she relies on food that Scooty's mother, her friend Ashley, gets from work. Moonee and Scooty show Jancey around and teach her things like how to get free ice cream by begging and where to get the best view of a woman who sunbathes topless by Magic Castle's pool. The children regularly inconvenience Bobby, the manager of Magic Castle, such as when they shut off the motel's power, but he remains protective of them.

The similarity of Magic Castle's name to Disney World's Magic Kingdom occasionally causes wealthy people to accidentally book rooms, but most of the residents do not have much money, and a church regularly delivers donated food. Halley avoids becoming homeless by beginning to sell knockoff perfume to tourists in the parking lots of nice hotels. Bobby's duties at Magic Castle include preparing expense reports, ejecting drug dealers, and doing repairs, and he sometimes enlists the help of his son, with whom he has a tenuous relationship. One day, while painting, he notices a strange man hanging around a group of children and ejects him from the property.

Scooty finds a lighter in a box that Dicky's family left behind when they moved away, and he, Moonee, and Jancey accidentally start a fire at an abandoned condominium complex. Ashley gets the truth out of him, after which she forbids him from hanging out with Moonee or Jancey and stops talking to Halley. When Halley learns this, she goes to the diner where Ashley works and makes a scene. Moonee and Jancey continue to play together and become best friends.

Without the free food from Ashley, and with security guards beginning to bother her at the hotels, Halley's financial situation declines even further. When she and Moonee move out of Magic Castle for the mandated 24 hours that month, they discover new owners at the motel they usually go to have raised the rates, so they instead spend the night with Stacey. Aware of this, Bobby is suspicious when Halley finally pays for her room, and it turns out she has begun to solicit sex work online, keeping Moonee in the bathroom with loud music when she has a client. She steals a client's Disney World resort passes to scalp them, and the man returns to demand them back. Bobby scares him off, but says Halley's guests now have to check in at the front desk. Desperate, she apologizes to Ashley for whatever Moonee did and asks for help with rent, but Ashley says Halley should have plenty of money, since she is prostituting herself. In front of Scooty, Halley punches Ashley in the face repeatedly and storms off.

Investigators from the DCF show up and question Halley and Moonee separately about their lifestyle. Halley has Moonee help clean their room and gives away her weed in anticipation of another visit. They go to a fancy hotel and have an extravagant meal, which Halley charges to a guest's room, and when they return to Magic Castle, the investigators, having found evidence Halley is doing sex work, are waiting with two police officers to take Moonee into foster care while they finish their inquiry. Not really understanding what is happening, Moonee asks to say goodbye to Scooty, who lets slip that she is going to a new family. She becomes agitated and runs away to bid Jancey goodbye, and Jancey, seeing her friend's distress, grabs Moonee's hand and escapes with her to Magic Kingdom.

Cast

Production

Development
The film stemmed from writer Chris Bergoch noticing a lot of children playing in motel parking lots while visiting his mother in Orlando, Florida. For his part, Sean Baker has said he has always been inspired by the Our Gang films, because the characters "were actually living in poverty, but the focus was the joy of childhood, the humor that comes from watching and hearing children."

In December 2017, producer Andrew Duncan stepped down from his role as financier of June Pictures after numerous allegations of sexual harassment. Baker stated, in part: "While we did not witness nor have any knowledge of inappropriate behavior, we are of course deeply concerned about these allegations. I have been outspoken before and firmly believe that film sets and work environments absolutely must be safe spaces for everyone regardless of gender, age, race, or creed."

Filming
The Florida Project was filmed in the summer of 2016 on location in Osceola County, Florida, including at the real Magic Castle Inn & Suites located on U.S. Highway 192 in Kissimmee, which is nearly six miles from Walt Disney World.

Unlike Baker's previous film, which was shot with an iPhone, The Florida Project was filmed using 35mm film, except for the final scene, which was shot without authorization in Disney World's Magic Kingdom park using an iPhone 6S Plus. To maintain secrecy, the shoot at the resort used a skeleton crew consisting of Baker, Bergoch, cinematographer Alexis Zabe, acting coach Samantha Quan, actors Valeria Cotto and Brooklynn Prince, and the girls' guardians. Baker intended the ending to be open to audience interpretation: "We've been watching Moonee use her imagination and wonderment throughout the entire film to make the best of the situation she's in—she can't go to Disney's Animal Kingdom, so she goes to the 'safari' behind the motel and looks at cows; she goes to the abandoned condos because she can't go to the Haunted Mansion. And in the end, with this inevitable drama, this is me saying to the audience, if you want a happy ending, you're gonna have to go to that headspace of a kid because, here, that's the only way to achieve it."

Release

The film had its world premiere on May 22, 2017, in the Directors Fortnight section of the 2017 Cannes Film Festival, and A24 acquired the U.S. distribution rights shortly thereafter. Its limited theatrical release in the U.S. began on October 6, 2017. Lionsgate released the film on Blu-ray, DVD, and download.

Critical response
The Florida Project received critical acclaim upon its release, with particular praise given to the direction and the performances of Dafoe, Prince, and Vinaite. On review aggregator website Rotten Tomatoes, it has an approval rating of 96% based on 320 reviews, with a weighted average score of 8.8/10; the site's "critics consensus" reads: "The Florida Project offers a colorfully empathetic look at an underrepresented part of the population that proves absorbing even as it raises sobering questions about modern America." On Metacritic, the film has a weighted average score of 92 out of 100 based on reviews from 44 critics, indicating "universal acclaim".

Ann Hornaday of The Washington Post wrote that "Dafoe delivers his finest performance in recent memory, bringing to levelheaded, unsanctimonious life a character who offers a glimmer of hope and caring within a world markedly short on both." Richard Roeper of the Chicago Sun-Times wrote: "It's film that'll make you wince at times, and you'll most likely not want to see twice, but seeing it once is an experience you'll not soon forget."

Accolades

References

External links
 

2017 films
2017 drama films
A24 (company) films
American drama films
2017 independent films
American independent films
Films about friendship
Films about prostitution in the United States
Films directed by Sean Baker
Films set in Orlando, Florida
Films shot in Florida
Films about families
Films about children
Films set in amusement parks
Films set in hotels
Kissimmee, Florida
Films about poverty in the United States
Walt Disney World in fiction
Films about mother–daughter relationships
2010s English-language films
2010s American films